NFL Football '94 Starring Joe Montana, released as simply NFL Football '94 in Japan, is a 1993 Sega Mega Drive/Genesis game. It features realistic running commentary while the player engages in exhibition, regular season, or playoff action. It is fifth in the Joe Montana Football series and the fourth to be developed by BlueSky Software. Unlike the earlier Joe Montana Football, this game had both NFL and NFLPA licenses, and as such, contains all of the league's (then) 28 NFL teams, and its players and their attributes for the 1993 season.

References
 Jock Mockery
 GameFAQs (infobox)

1993 video games
Joe Montana video games
NFL Sports Talk Football video games
Sega video games
Sega Genesis games
Sega Genesis-only games
Video games developed in the United States
Video games scored by Sam Powell
Multiplayer and single-player video games
Montana, Joe
Montana, Joe
Video games based on real people